Chinese temple architecture refer to a type of structures used as place of worship of Chinese Buddhism, Taoism or Chinese folk religion, where people revere ethnic Chinese gods and ancestors. They can be classified as:
 miào or diàn, simply means "temple" and mostly enshrines gods of the Chinese pantheon, such as the Dragon King, Tudigong or Matsu; or mythical or historical figures, such as Guandi or Shennong. 
 cí, cítáng, zōngcí or zǔmiào, referring to ancestral temples, mostly enshrining the ancestral gods of a family or clan.
 Taoist temples and monasteries:  guàn or  dàoguàn; and
 Chinese Buddhist temples and monasteries:  sì or  sìyuàn
 Temple of Confucius which usually functions as both temple and town school:  wénmiào or  kŏngmiào. 
 Temples of City God, which worships the patron God of a village, town or a city. 
 Smaller household shrines or votive niche, such as the worship of Zaoshen and Caishen. 

Gōng, meaning "palace" is a term used for a templar complex of multiple buildings, while yuàn, meaning  "institution," is a generic term meaning "sanctuary" or "shrine". Táng (堂) means courtyard or room, and ān (庵) means dome or nunnery.

Overview
Shen temples are distinct from Taoist temples in that they are established and administered by local managers, village communities, lineage congregations and worship associations. They don't have professional priests, although Taoist priests, fashi, Confucian lisheng, and also wu and tongji shamans, may perform services within the temples. Shenist temples are usually small and decorated with traditional figures on their roofs (dragons and deities), although some evolve into significant structures.

Chinese temples can be found throughout Mainland China and Taiwan, and also where Chinese expatriate communities have settled. An old name in English for Chinese traditional temples is "joss house". "Joss" is an Anglicized spelling of deus, the Portuguese word for "god". The term "joss house" was in common use in English in the nineteenth century, for example in North America during frontier times, when joss houses were a common feature of Chinatowns. The name "joss house" describes the environment of worship. Joss sticks, a kind of incense, are burned inside and outside of the temple.

See also
 Jingxiang
 Taoist temple
 Confucian temple
 Chinese ritual mastery traditions
 Chinese folk religion
 Chinese folk religion in Southeast Asia
 List of Mazu temples
 List of City God Temples in China
 List of temples in Taichung, Taiwan
 Tin Hau temples in Hong Kong
 Kwan Tai temples in Hong Kong
 Chinese temples in Kolkata

References

External links

 China Ancestral Temples Network
 Chinese Temples in Penang

Sacral architecture
Temples in Chinese folk religion